The Atlantis Hotel and Waterpark is a resort hotel with an indoor water park located in Wisconsin Dells, Wisconsin. It has three waterpark areas: two indoor and one outdoor. Admission to nearby Noah's Ark, the largest outdoor water park in the United States, is included with booking. The hotel is owned by Cornerstone Hotel Management.

References 

Water parks in Wisconsin
Wisconsin Dells, Wisconsin